Germany–Vietnam relations are the bilateral relations between Germany and Vietnam.

Germany has an embassy in Hanoi while Vietnam has an embassy in Berlin.

History

World War I 

During the first 6 months of World War I the government-general of French Indochina expelled all German and Austro-Hungarian people living in French Indochina.

The two largest pre-war import/export houses, Speidel & Co. and F. Engler & Co., were German companies which caused them to be officially re-organised as French companies, however in reality they continued to operate under both German control and using German capital. During the 1910s Speidel & Co. was the largest importer of European goods into the country with Engler being one of its major competitors. After the German owners were expulsed from the company lower level employees tried to continue running these companies despite increasing push back from the French colonial authorities by means of arbitrary customs enforcement, freight interference, and regulatory aggravations. Later the French would seize all of the German Speidel Company's warehouses and would sell the seized goods at low prices both to Vietnamese consumers and Chinese exporters to try and increase revenue. These goods included rice, wine, and canned goods.

2017 kidnapping of Trịnh Xuân Thanh 

In 2017, Trịnh Xuân Thanh, a former communist party member and businessman who was accused of being corrupt, was secretly abducted and kidnapped in Berlin by a group of unnamed Vietnamese personnel believed to be Vietnamese agents in Germany. In response, Germany accused Vietnam for "violating the territorial rights of Germany" and ordered a total expulsion of a number of Vietnamese foreign officials in Germany. Germany also suspended Vietnamese workers from going to Germany to start for investigation. Although tensions have been lessened, the German officials remain skeptical and distrust toward their Vietnamese counterparts, and sometimes the abduction was often retold as a consequence of distrusts.

Agreements
In October 2011, German Chancellor Angela Merkel and Vietnamese Prime Minister Nguyễn Tấn Dũng signed the "Hanoi Declaration", establishing a Strategic Partnership between Germany and Vietnam that is designed to strengthen political, economic and cultural relations and development cooperation.

Economic relations
Vietnam is in the process of ratifying a free trade agreement with the European Union which includes Germany as Europe's largest economy. In 2016, bilateral trade was worth US$10.3 billion.

Education cooperation
The Vietnamese-German University was opened in Ho Chi Minh City in September 2008.

See also
 Vietnamese people in Germany

References

External links

 
Vietnam
Bilateral relations of Vietnam